ROUND1 Japan Cup is an annual PBA (Professional Bowlers Association) and JPBA (Japan Professional Bowling Association) bowling event sponsored by ROUND1. In its earlier years, the tournament typically featured the top 16 bowlers from each organization, but has recently enjoyed an expanded field.  It has been dominated by PBA Tour professionals since 1989.  Until Yuya Katoh's win in 2013, the last JPBA bowler to win the event was Takeo Sakai in 1988.

The tournament celebrated its 25th anniversary in 2010. The 2010 Dydo Japan Cup featured a starting field of 144 bowlers, which included JPBA members from Japan and South Korea, PBA members, and Japanese amateurs.

The event was not held in 2011, due in large part to the earthquake and resulting tsunami  in Japan.

The 2013 edition of the Japan Cup was held from November 28 through December 1, 2013. The top 16 PBA Tour players (based on 2012-13 competition points), plus a handful of at-large PBA Tour invitees, joined a large field of players from Japan and South Korea.

2013 Results

TV Finals

Round of 8
Match 1: Shinichi Horie (Japan) def. Sean Rash (USA) 225-224
Match 2: Yuya Katoh (Japan) def. Osku Palermaa (Finland) 258-226
Match 3: E. J. Tackett (USA) def. Tommy Jones (USA) 226-224
Match 4: Kazuaki Watanabe (Japan) def. Chris Barnes (USA) 278-239

Semifinals
Match 1: Katoh def. Horie 236-195
Match 2: Watanabe def. Tackett 249-190

Finals
Katoh def. Watanabe 243-235

Final standings 
1st Place - Yuya Katoh, Japan (US$57,250)
2nd Place - Kazuaki Watanabe, Japan (US$30,525)
3rd Place - Shinichi Horie, Japan (US$14,300)
3rd Place - E. J. Tackett, USA (US$14,300)
5th Place - Sean Rash, USA (US$7,250)
5th Place - Osku Palermaa, Finland (US$7,250)
5th Place - Tommy Jones, USA (US$7,250)
5th Place - Chris Barnes, USA (US$7,250)

Winners 
2019 Jason Belmonte
2018 Dominic Barrett
2017 E. J. Tackett
2016 Amleto Monacelli
2015 Chris Barnes
2014 Park Kyung Shin
2013 Yuya Katoh
2012 Mika Koivuniemi
2010 Tommy Jones
2009 Patrick Allen
2007 Mika Koivuniemi
2006 Walter Ray Williams, Jr.
2005 Tommy Jones
2004 Tommy Jones
2003 Chris Barnes
2002 Robert Smith
2001 Bob Learn, Jr.
2000 Parker Bohn III
1999 Parker Bohn III
1998 Parker Bohn III
1997 Doug Kent
1996 Steve Wilson
1995 Amleto Monacelli
1994 Brian Voss
1993 Pete Weber
1992 Parker Bohn III
1991 Walter Ray Williams, Jr.
1990 Chris Warren
1989 Randy Pedersen
1988 Takeo Sakai
1987 Amleto Monacelli
1986 Pete Weber
1985 Ken Taniguchi

References

Ten-pin bowling competitions in Japan